"Somebody" is a country music song written by Dave Berg, Sam Tate, and Annie Tate.  It was initially recorded by American country music singer Mark Wills for his 2001 studio album Loving Every Minute.  Reba McEntire later recorded the same song for her 2003 album Room to Breathe, releasing it as that album's second single in January 2004.  By August of that year, McEntire's version had reached the top of the Billboard Hot Country Singles & Tracks (now Hot Country Songs) charts, becoming her 22nd number hit of her career and her first since "If You See Him/If You See Her" with Brooks & Dunn in 1998.

Content
The protagonist, a male patron at a diner, vents to the waitress serving him about his so far unfruitful love life. The waitress reminds him to pay attention to the people around him because he'd never know where he might find the one for him, so he tries this in the elevator at his workplace. In the last verse, it is revealed that the protagonist and waitress ended up falling in love.

Chart performance
The song debuted at number 55 on the U.S. Billboard Hot Country Singles & Tracks for the week ending January 17, 2004. The song reached No. 1 on the chart dated August 7, 2004, at which point a column in the magazine noted that the song's increase in airplay to the top position was likely due to stations being sponsored to play the song very heavily during the nighttime. As a result, it was only the fourth song since 1993, when the charts were first tabulated by counting spins, to gain by more than 1,000 spins in a week in its ascent to No. 1.

Year-end charts

References 

2004 singles
Country ballads
2000s ballads
Reba McEntire songs
Mark Wills songs
Music videos directed by Trey Fanjoy
Songs written by Dave Berg (songwriter)
Song recordings produced by Norro Wilson
Song recordings produced by Buddy Cannon
MCA Nashville Records singles
2001 songs